Ibrahim Wisan (born 27 February 1977), nicknamed as Kandi is a Maldivian cinematographer, actor and director.

Career
In 1996, Wisan starred in Mohamed Rasheed's Hifehettumeh Neiy Karuna opposite Niuma Mohamed, Abdul Raheem and Arifa Ibrahim. He again collaborated with Arifa Ibrahim for her drama film Dhauvaa, an unofficial remake of Deepak Sareen's Bollywood film Aaina (1993), where he reprised the role played by Deepak Tijori in the original. After working as a cinematographer in Easa Shareef's horror classic Fathis Handhuvaru (1997), Wisan was offered the role behind camera for several other films.

In 2000, he appeared in year's most successful Maldivian film, Ahmed Nimal's horror classic Zalzalaa (2000) where Wisan portrays the character Ahmed Zameel, a divorcee who gets trapped in the path of a female spirit assigned to complete an unfulfilled prophecy. He next starred alongside Ali Seezan, Mariyam Nazima and Yoosuf Shafeeu in Mohamed Rasheed's Hithu Vindhu (2000) while working as the cinematographer of the film.

The following year he worked with Aishath Ali Manik for Hiiy Edhenee (2001) which was an unofficial remake of Dharmesh Darshan's romantic film Dhadkan (2000) where he reprised the role played by Parmeet Sethi in the original, the wicked step-brother.

Wisan collaborated with Easa Shareef for the horror film Ginihila (2003) alongside Ali Seezan, Niuma Mohamed, Mariyam Nisha and Reeko Moosa Manik, playing the role of a supportive friend. The film narrates the story of a young couple who decided to spend a romantic break to save their crumbling marriage and how events take a sinister turn when the wife experiences supernatural incidence which has her husband involvement in it. The film is an unofficial remake of Vikram Bhatt's Indian horror film Raaz (2002) which itself is an unofficial adaptation of What Lies Beneath. The same year, he worked with Amjad Ibrahim for his romantic horror film Dhonkamana (2003) which narrates the romantic relationship between a young man and an old woman. Featuring Fauziyya Hassan, Yoosuf Shafeeu, Sheela Najeeb, Niuma Mohamed, Sheereen Abdul Wahid and Amira Ismail, the film received mainly negative reviews from critics though its portrayal of the relationship between a couple with a large age difference was praised.

In 2005, Wisan collaborated with Abdul Faththaah for his romantic disaster film, Hureemey Inthizaarugaa (2005) cast along with Ravee Farooq, Mariyam Zuhura, Waleedha Waleed, Ibrahim Jihad and Neena Saleem. The film, heavily relied on the effect of the 2004 Indian Ocean earthquake on the Maldives, received favorable reviews from critics though it failed to perform financially.

In 2016, Wisan released his debut direction, Vee Beyvafa, a melodrama which was shot in 2011 and delayed in post-production. The film received negative responses from critics, with Ahmed Adhushan of Mihaaru calling it "a step backward" in the progress of cinema.

Filmography

Feature film

Television

Short film

Other work

Accolades

References 

Maldivian male film actors
1977 births
Living people
Maldivian film directors
Maldivian cinematographers